"Desire (Me Tienes Loquita)" is a song by Mexican singer Paulina Rubio and Venezuelan singer Nacho. The song was released to digital retailers and streaming services by the Spanish division of Universal Music Group on May 25, 2018 as the fourt single from Rubio's eleventh studio album "Deseo". The song was written by 	Paulina Rubio, Mauricio Rengifo, Andrés Torres, Miguel Ignacio Mendoza Donatti "Nacho", with a production by Andrés Torres and Mauricio Rengifo.

Music video
The music video was filmed on location in La Habana and Miami, it was directed by Cuban director Alejandro Pérez who already worked with Rubio before on her singles "Si Te Vas" and "Me Quema".

Track listing 
Digital download
 "Desire (Me Tienes Loquita)" – 3:10

Charts

Weekly charts

Year-end charts

References 

2018 singles
Paulina Rubio songs
Spanish-language songs
Universal Music Latino singles
2018 songs
Songs written by Paulina Rubio
Songs written by Andrés Torres (producer)
Song recordings produced by Andrés Torres (producer)
Songs written by Mauricio Rengifo